Elder law is an area of legal practice that specializes on issues that affect the senior population.  The purpose of elder law planning is to prepare the elderly person for financial freedom and autonomy through proper financial planning and long-term care options.

Categories
The three major categories that make up elder law are:

 Estate planning and administration, including tax questions
 Medicaid, disability and other long-term care issues
 Guardianship, conservatorship and commitment matters, including fiduciary administration

Other issues found under the umbrella of elder law include such areas as:

History
Elder law developed as a specialty because as  lifespans increased there was an increased need for medical care, care giving, and financial management.

The Older Americans Act (OAA), originally signed into law by President Lyndon B. Johnson on July 14, 1965 (the same year Medicare was created), created the Administration on Aging (AOA), a division within the Department of Health and Human Services. The OAA also authorized grants to States for community planning and services programs, funding for research, and demonstration and training projects in the field of aging.

In 1972 Amendments to the OAA added the national nutrition program for the elderly. The OAA of 2000 was amended on November 13, 2000, to include the National Family Caregiver Support Program, which was intended to help hundreds of thousands of family members who are struggling to care for their older loved ones who are ill or who have disabilities. This program provides grant funding for combined services between state and local agencies for such things as counseling, support groups, respite and other community-based services. These services are focused on the care of the frail and aging members of society. The program also provides services geared towards the family units of grandparents and other older relatives now in the stages of care-taking for related children eighteen years of age and under.

Elder law is an expansion of the traditional trust and estates practice.

Careers in or associated with elder law

Careers that are developing around the area of Elder Law include:

Essentially any career field can create a benefit to the aging of modern society.

See also
Elder rights
Gerontology
Nursing home residents' rights

References

Kenney F. Hegland & Robert B. Fleming, Alive and Kicking: Legal Advice . . . for Boomers (Carolina Academic Press 2007)

External links
National Academy of Elder Law Attorneys
 National Elder Law Foundation
Administration on Aging
http://www.agingcarefl.org/aging/legal
https://web.archive.org/web/20051119010913/http://www.neln.org/sitemap.html
http://www.abanet.org/aging/

 
Medicare and Medicaid (United States)